Hālaulani station (also known as Leeward Community College station) is an under construction Honolulu Rail Transit station in Pearl City, Hawaii, serving Leeward Community College. It is the only station on the system not built on elevated tracks.

The Hawaiian Station Name Working Group proposed Hawaiian names for the nine rail stations on the Ewa end of the rail system (stations west of and including Aloha Stadium) in November 2017, and HART adopted the proposed names on February 22, 2018. Hālaulani means "heavenly halau", a chief's house, and refers to an ‘ili between several ponds and the government road.

References

External links
 

Honolulu Rail Transit stations
Railway stations scheduled to open in 2023
Railway stations in the United States at university and college campuses
Pearl City, Hawaii